Joseph Chrape (November 24, 1910 – November 24, 1950) was an American football player. A native of Bovey, Minnesota, he played college football at Hibbing Community College and professional football in the National Football League (NFL). He was a guard and tackle for the Minneapolis Red Jackets, appearing in nine NFL games, eight as a starter, during the 1929 season. After his football career ended, he worked for the Cleveland Cliffs Iron Company in Coleraine, Minnesota. He died in 1950 on his 40th birthday and was buried at Lakeview Cemetery in Coleraine.

References

1950 deaths
Minneapolis Red Jackets players
Players of American football from Minnesota
1910 births